is a Japanese manga series written and illustrated by Chica Umino. It has been serialized in Hakusensha's seinen manga magazine Young Animal since July 2007, with its chapters collected in sixteen tankōbon volumes as of September 2021. It features the life of Rei Kiriyama, an introvert and professional shogi player, who gradually develops both his play and his relationship with others.

An anime television series adapted by Shaft aired on NHK G from October 2016 to March 2017 and a second season aired from October 2017 to March 2018, with each season consisting of 22 episodes. The English dubbed version was released in four parts by Aniplex of America between December 2017 and April 2019. A two-part live-action film adaptation was released in 2017. Denpa will start releasing the English version of the manga in 2023. A spin-off of the manga ran from 2015 to 2020.

March Comes In like a Lion won the 4th Manga Taishō, the 35th Kodansha Manga Award in its general category, the 18th Tezuka Osamu Cultural Prize's Grand Prize, and the manga division's Grand Prix of the 24th Japan Media Arts Festival. The story has been praised for the psychological depiction of its characters. The anime adaptation has been overall well received by critics, being considered as one of the best of 2010s.

Plot
The town where the main character Rei Kiriyama lives is set in Shinkawa which is situated along Tokyo's Sumida River. The Kawamoto family's home is set in Tsukuda which is connected to the town Rei lives in through the Chuo bridge. The shogi hall of the manga is set in Sendagaya area and it resembles the headquarters of the Japanese Shogi Association that is situated there. Rei Kiriyama's parents and younger sister died in an accident in his childhood. He then started living with the family of Masachika Kōda who was a friend of his father. Reaching adulthood, Rei left his foster family thinking he was only causing trouble. He now lives alone and has few friends. Among his acquaintances are three sisters of the Kawamoto family—Akari, Hinata, and Momo. As the story progresses, Rei deals with his maturation both as a professional shogi player and as a person, all the while strengthening his relationships with others, particularly the Kawamoto sisters.

Characters

Main characters

Played by: Ryunosuke Kamiki
17 years old at the beginning of the series, later turns 18. A five dan at the beginning of the series, he is later promoted to six dan. Rei became a professional shogi player while in middle school and his achievements soon made him one of the most promising players of his generation. After his parents and sister died in a traffic accident, he was taken in by his father's friend Kōda and became his apprentice in shogi. After becoming a professional shogi player and completing middle school, he decided to become independent and not attend high school. However, after feeling a "need" to attend school, Rei joins a high school after a one-year delay. He lives in the city of Rokugatsu-chō (June town).

Played by: Kana Kurashina
A resident of Sangatsu-chō (March town), she is the eldest of three sisters. After her mother and grandmother’s death, she starts taking care of her two younger sisters. In the morning, she helps her elderly grandfather run a traditional wagashi (Japanese confectionery) shop, Mikazuki-dō, while in the evening, she works as a hostess for a bar in Ginza, Misaki, which her aunt manages. Akari gets acquainted with Rei when she finds him on the street when his older shogi rivals got him drunk and abandoned him; she takes him to her home and looks after him all night, which starts Rei's close relationship with the family. She often calls Rei "Rei-kun". This leads Kyoko to become jealous of her.

Played by: Kaya Kiyohara
The second of the three sisters. A middle school student. She sleeps late in the mornings till the very last minute and often makes bentos by herself. She calls Rei "Rei-chan". Like her elder sister Akari, she likes taking care of Rei, who develops romantic feelings for her as the series progresses. She has a strong loyalty toward her friends and family. She aspires to be as mature as her sister when she gets older. Later she graduates from middle school, enrolls at the same high school where Rei studies, and starts dating him.

Played by: Chise Niitsu
The youngest of the three sisters. A preschool student, she attends a daycare center. Pure and innocent, she has a bit of a selfish streak at times. Her favorite anime character is Bodoro (modelled on My Neighbour Totoro'''s Totoro). She calls Rei "Rei-chan".

Kōda family

Played by: Etsushi Toyokawa
Rei's shogi teacher, a pro eight dan. He was both a friend and rival in shogi to Rei's biological father. After Rei's parents and sister died, he adopts Rei and guides him in shogi. He is serious about shogi and is very strict with his biological children when they were studying it themselves. Because of the attention that their father showed Rei, both the Koda children grew to resent Rei and treated him poorly as he was growing up in their household.

Played by: Kasumi Arimura
Kōda's daughter and Ayumu’s older sister. She is four years older than Rei. Beautiful and hot-tempered, Kyōko seems to hold a grudge against Rei as she has the habit of exerting a negative influence on him by discouraging him purposefully before his matches. She appears to be in love with Masamune Gotō, a married man. When she was younger, she was openly hostile to Rei when he first joins the family because she is jealous of the attention her father gives Rei. She aspired to become a professional shogi player but was discouraged by her father as the field was dominated by men and she was not talented enough to be a part of it. She often goes to Rei's apartment whenever she is feeling lonely. Later on, she admits to herself that she was unfair to Rei because she realizes that he wasn't trying to steal her family, rather, he just wanted to be part of one.

Kōda's son and Kyōko's younger brother. He is the same age as Rei. After losing to Rei in shogi, he stopped playing at all and afterward started confining himself to his room and only playing video games.

Professional shōgi players

Played by: Shota Sometani
Rei's self-proclaimed "best friend" and "lifelong rival". A four dan, he has played with Rei since they were children. Even though he appears to be healthy, he is chronically ill, which has contributed to his obesity. He is from an extremely wealthy family. He is modeled after an actual real-life shogi player Satoshi Murayama.

Played by: Kuranosuke Sasaki
In his late 30s, of the same age as Tōji Sōya. Eight dan. He is a senior fellow student of Nikaidō, whom he takes care of like his own little brother. He is a gentle-tempered person and is naturally inclined to look after younger shogi players. But he is also an incredibly tough soldier in shogi. He hosts the "Shimada shogi workshops", which he invited Rei to join. He originally comes from a rural area. In his youth, he had to work long hours on the farm and relied on his fellow villagers' donations to support his shogi study in Tokyo. He has chronic stomach pain because of the stress from his matches. Takanori Jingūji, the chairman of the Japan Shogi Association, often laments that Shimada is not charismatic or as good-looking as Sōya, the current Meijin, who is his same age.

Played by: Hideaki Itō
In his early 40s. Nine dan. A tall and muscular man with a stern and frightening face. His wife is in a coma and appears to have been hospitalized for a long time. He was a younger fellow pupil of Masachika Kōda, whose daughter Kyōko he appears to have a very complicated relationship with, though he calls her a "stalker". Rei sees him as the main antagonist in life for he thinks Gotō is having an affair with Kyōko and breaking her heart. He had an altercation with Rei where he punches him when he was confronted for his improper relationship with Kyōko. Even though she loves Gotō, Kyōko is the one who often helps him get gifts for his comatose wife. He is generally very forthright and impatient to the point of being arrogant, but he also doesn't hesitate to stand up for Shimada when he overhears some other players making demeaning comments about him.

Played by: Ryo Kase
The current Meijin. He has longed for a rival like Rei. Similar to Rei, he became a professional shōgi player in middle school, and several players who faced both pointed out that their playing styles are very similar. He became the youngest ever Meijin at age 21. Later in the story, it's revealed that he has intermittent hearing loss due to unknown causes.

Played by: Hiroyuki Onoue
26 years old. Five dan. A quite expressive and enthusiastic person, he can be aggressive at times as well. He comes from the countryside. He is a fan of Akari.

Played by: Tomoya Nakamura
26 years old. Six dan. He is often called . A bit aloof, he gets along well with Matsumoto.

A nine dan professional shogi player, ranked A for the past eight years, Tsujii Takeshi is a lover of wordplay and craves public attention. Other people within the shogi world call him waste of good looks' due to his propensity for dad jokes and terrible puns. He is usually the only one to laugh at his gags. Tsujii played against Rei during the quarterfinals of the 20th Lion King Tournament.

65 years old. A seven dan. He is a veteran who has been a professional shogi player for over 40 years. He comes from Fukushima.

A six dan. Upon losing a match, he lost his temper, thus resulting in him divorcing his wife.

Shogi Dragon titleholder. Passionate about eventually dethroning Sōya. He temporarily separates from his wife when he thinks a hostess from a bar has genuine affection for him.

Other characters

A middle school student. A childhood friend and classmate of Hinata's, he is her first crush. He is the son of a milkman. He is the ace of his school's baseball team and aims to be a professional. Since Rei became a professional shogi player in middle school, Yūsuke greatly looks up to him. His father and grandfather are both fans of Rei. He is very straightforward and encourages Hinata during the time she was being bullied. To realize his dream to become a professional, he moves to a high school in Shikoku seeking to participate in the kōshien baseball tournament, much to Hinata's sadness.

Played by: Gin Maeda
The grandfather of the three Kawamoto sisters. He runs a traditional wagashi shop, Mikazuki-dō (Crescent Moon). Even though he gives off an impression of a grumpy old man, he dotes on his granddaughters a lot, in particular Momo, and aims to live long enough to send them away for their marriages. He is incredibly passionate about being the sole male protector of the family.

The butler of the Nikaidō family, who has been in continuous service for them for over 45 years. A gentle and kind elderly man, he has been taking care of Harunobu ever since he was a baby.

A teacher of the high school where Rei decided to join. He is a big fan of shogi and regularly reads shogi magazines. He is the only one in the high school who had heard of Rei being a professional shogi player though when he first knew of him joining, he presumed he only had the same surname. He speaks in a very friendly manner with Rei and is often concerned with his well-being, always thinking of ways to help him socialize with others. He later develops feelings for Akari.

Played by: Yuka Itaya
The aunt of the three Kawamoto sisters. She, helped by Akari, manages a bar in Ginza called "Misaki". She has a strong and confident personality and employs Akari to work at her bar so she can at least spend one night a week dressing up so she doesn't lose herself to a state of only being a mother to her younger sisters. She encourages Rei to bring his fellow shogi players to the bar so she can make money off of them.

President of the After School Bunsen Burners Club, a chemistry club in the school Rei goes to. Because he has a mustache, everyone assumes that he is Rei's teacher.

Played by: Yusuke Iseya
The father of the three Kawamoto sisters. He left them and their mother when Momo was still a baby to live with another woman and returns several years later, after a long time without contacting them once. Once Misaki warns Rei about him, Rei makes his investigation about Seijirou and discovers that he kept leading an irresponsible life, involving himself with other women and abandoning them on his whim, just like he did with Akari, Hinata, and Momo's mother. After Rei exposes Seijirou, the sisters reject his plea to raise their half-sister, the daughter of one of his other women, and he leaves with her to never return.
,  and 

The three cats of the Kawamoto household. Kuro-chan the tuxedo cat and Mike-chan the calico cat were the first two gathered, while Shiro-chan the white cat is a new arrival. They are big-eyed and always appear hungry. Shiro-chan looks strikingly like an owl at times.

The late mother of the three Kawamoto sisters.

The late grandmother of the three Kawamoto sisters.

Production
The English title March Comes In Like a Lion is written on the cover of the manga. Although Umino had not seen the 1992 film , the movie poster and the title of the movie left an impression on her: "A girl with a black haircut is holding a half-eaten ice cream in her mouth". This phrase is from the British weather proverb "March comes in like a lion and goes out like a lamb". In addition, the supervisor, Manabu Senzaki, commented that the shogi rankings begin in June, and the final game for promotion and demotion is held in March, so the professionals become lions in March.

Umino stated that the manga is "a story based on researching and hearing various stories about worlds [she] didn't know" whereas her previous work, Honey and Clover is "a story about a world [she] already knew without having to extend [herself]". She chose to write something different from her previous work for if it was a failure, people would think she moved to another field too hastily rather than call her a "one-hit wonder". Umino said that she wanted the manga to be adapted by Shaft under Akiyuki Shinbo's direction and if it was not possible then the manga "did not need to be adapted". She doubted if they would accept to adapt the manga as unlike adapting a light novel (like Monogatari) or making an original anime (such as Puella Magi Madoka Magica), they would not have much freedom. She thinks that Shinbo usually shows a close-up view of the characters rather than showing them from a distance which is a reason she stated why she wanted him as the director. Shinbo said that he wanted to make each of the three primary settings Rei's room, the Kawamoto house and the shogi halldistinct to make the world into a sort of triangle. He also visited Tsukishima to see the Kawamoto house area and a bridge used in the manga.

Media
MangaMarch Comes In like a Lion is written and illustrated by Chica Umino. The series began in Hakusensha's seinen manga magazine Young Animal on July 13, 2007. Hakusensha has collected its chapters into individual tankōbon volumes. The first volume was released on February 22, 2008. , sixteen volumes have been released.

In North America, Denpa announced in March 2021 that they have licensed the manga for English release. The first volume is set to be released in January 2023. A spin-off of the manga named March Comes In like a Lion: Shakunetsu no Toki was published in Young Animal from April 2015 to March 2020. It features 27-year-old Takanori Jingūji who is the chairman of the Japanese Shogi Association in the manga.

Volume list

 Chapters not yet in tankōbon format 
These chapters have yet to be published in a tankōbon volume.

Anime

An anime television series adaptation was announced in the Young Animal magazine's 19th issue of 2015 on September 25, 2015. The series is produced by Shaft and directed by Akiyuki Shinbo and Kenjirou Okada, featuring character designs by Nobuhiro Sugiyama and music composed by Yukari Hashimoto. The anime's first opening and ending theme songs are performed by Bump of Chicken, titled "Answer" and "Fighter", respectively. Yuki performed the series' second opening theme song, titled "Goodbye Bystander", while Kenshi Yonezu performed the series' second ending theme song, titled "Orion".

Season one of the anime began airing on October 8, 2016 and finished airing on March 18, 2017 with a total of 22 episodes. A second season, announced at the end of the first season's final episode, premiered on October 14, 2017 and finished airing on March 31, 2018 with a total of 22 episodes. The series aired on NHK G at 23:00 on Saturdays. It was also simulcasted by Crunchyroll. The series was licensed by Aniplex of America and Anime Limited for North America and the United Kingdom, respectively. Aniplex of America released the English dub of the first season in two Blu-ray discs, the first half of the season was released on December 19, 2017 and the second on April 10, 2018. The second season was also released in two halves, the first on December 18, 2018 and the second on April 9, 2019.

Live-action film

A two-part live action film adaptation of the same name directed by Keishi Ōtomo, starring Ryūnosuke Kamiki and distributed by Toho and Asmik Ace was released in two parts in 2017, with the first part released on March 18 and the second released on April 22.

Reception
Manga
As of January 2022, March Comes In like a Lion had over 3 million copies in circulation.

The manga was nominated for the 2nd Annual Manga Taishō award in 2009; and it won this award in its 4th edition in 2011. Also in 2011, it won the 35th Kodansha Manga Award in the general category (shared with Space Brothers). In 2014, it won the Grand Prize of the 18th Tezuka Osamu Cultural Prize. In 2021, the manga won the manga division's Grand Prize of the 24th Japan Media Arts Festival. On Kadokawa Media Factory's Da Vinci magazine "Book of the Year" list, March Comes In like a Lion topped the list for three consecutive years from 2015 to 2017, ranked 4th in 2019 and 8th in 2020. In top manga for male readers category of Takarajimasha's Kono Manga ga Sugoi! list, the manga ranked 5th and tied for 7th (with Drifters) in 2012 and 2017, respectively. On TV Asahi's Manga Sōsenkyo 2021 poll, in which 150.000 people voted for their top 100 manga series, March Comes In like a Lion ranked 99th.

Anime
The anime was listed as one of the top 25 anime of 2010s by Anime Feminist. Crunchyroll listed it in their "Top 100 best anime of the 2010s". IGN also listed March Comes In like a Lion among the best anime series of the 2010s. The second season was placed as "runner-up" in IGN's "best anime series of 2018" list.

Both seasons of the anime adaption was given 4 stars out of 5 by Allen Moody of THEM Anime Reviews. He liked how Kyoko is shown to have a vulnerable side under her external cruelty and how the Kawamoto sisters are portrayed when Hinata is being bullied. He also found the story relatable to his own life, and stated "A neurotic and sometimes endearing hero, an incredibly nuanced "villainous" sibling, and a shogi master in the twilight of his career are all fine, I appreciate the things it is trying to do I can identify with some of the things that happen here from personal experience. Overall, lots of solid drama. It was a vert pleasant surprise to discover".

Chris Beveridge of The Fandom Post also praised the portrayal of the characters and their lives. He liked Nikkaido's backstory and his connection with Shimada. Beveridge gave the anime an audio grade of "B+", and he gave the video an "A" praising how Shaft presented the details, animation quality, and color design in the series. After watching the first episode, Amelia Cook of Anime Feminist'' found the art direction unconventional. She liked the art style and praised the transition from the expression of Rei's depression to the presentation of humor saying that it was skillfully done. Marion Bea of the same website praised the exploration of the characters' lives and struggles. She also praised the portrayal of the character's psychology and the depiction of others' support in solving one's problems. Bea commended the use of the surrounding environment in portraying the characters' emotional state, for instance showing them struggling to keep swimming or surrounding them with snow.

Notes

References

External links
 March Comes in like a Lion at Young Animal 
 Official anime website 
 Official anime website 
 

2007 manga
Anime series based on manga
Aniplex
Coming-of-age anime and manga
Crunchyroll Anime Awards winners
Hakusensha franchises
Hakusensha manga
Manga adapted into films
Manga Taishō
NHK original programming
Romance anime and manga
Seinen manga
Shaft (company)
Shogi in anime and manga
Slice of life anime and manga
Winner of Kodansha Manga Award (General)
Winner of Tezuka Osamu Cultural Prize (Grand Prize)